The Union Church of All Faiths, also known as the United Memorial Chapel for All Faiths, is a  by  wood-framed building or chapel located in Hudson, Massachusetts, United States. It is occasionally cited as the smallest church in the United States. However, smaller and older "tiny churches" exist in the United States. Retired clergyman Rev. Louis Winth West built the chapel in 1953 beside his own home on Central Street and in the 1970s it was moved to the grounds of the First Federated Church of Hudson, where it was located for many years. The building's interior fits four people, although 100 people sometimes gathered outside for religious services, including weddings. In 2003 former Hudson resident Vic Petkauskos bought the chapel, relocated it to Hyannis, Massachusetts, and renovated it. He planned to place it on a barge and hold wedding ceremonies off the coast of Cape Cod, although whether he ever did so is unclear. The church still exists: at some point it made its way back to Hudson from Hyannis. It is currently located on private property on Causeway Street in Hudson, where it is visible from the road.

Notes

References

Churches completed in 1953
Buildings and structures in Hudson, Massachusetts
Churches in Middlesex County, Massachusetts